Žygimantas Vaičiūnas (born 19 January 1982) is a Lithuanian politician. He served as Minister of Energy in the cabinet of Prime Minister Saulius Skvernelis from 13 December 2016 to 11 December 2020. Dainius Kreivys was appointed as his successor.

References 

Living people
1982 births
Place of birth missing (living people)
21st-century Lithuanian politicians
Ministers of Energy of Lithuania